Macrocheles roquensis is a species of mite in the family Macrochelidae.

References

roquensis
Articles created by Qbugbot
Animals described in 1992